Wesley Township is located in Will County, Illinois. As of the 2010 census, its population was 2,241 and it contained 891 housing units. Wesley Township was formed from the south-eastern part of Wilmington Township in 1846.  Wesley, Illinois was the setting for a murder in the 1966 mystery fiction book "Deadline" by Thomas B. Dewey

School Districts
 Wilmington Community School District 209-U
 Manteno Community School District Unit 5

Geography

Demographics

References

External links
City-data.com
Township Website
Will County Historical Society
Township Map
Will County Official Site
Illinois State Archives

Townships in Will County, Illinois
Townships in Illinois
1846 establishments in Illinois